HBIC may refer to:
Huamei-Bond International College
"Head Bitch in Charge", a nickname of Tiffany Pollard